James Franklin Aldrich (April 6, 1853 – March 8, 1933) was a United States representative from Illinois.

Biography
He was born on April 6, 1853, in Two Rivers, Wisconsin. He moved with his parents to Chicago, Illinois, in April 1861 where he attended the public schools. Later, he attended Chicago University and graduated from Rensselaer Polytechnic Institute, Troy, New York, in 1877. He engaged in the manufacture of linseed oil and later engaged in the gas business.

Aldrich was a member of the Cook County Board of Commissioners from 1886 to 1888, serving as president in 1887. He was also a member of the county board of education in 1887 and commissioner of public works of Chicago from May 1, 1891, to January 1, 1893. Aldrich was elected as a Republican to the Fifty-third and Fifty-fourth Congresses (March 4, 1893 – March 3, 1897) and served as chairman, Committee on Accounts (Fifty-fourth Congress). He was not a candidate for renomination in 1896.

After leaving Congress, Aldrich was appointed Consul General at Havana, Cuba in 1897, but did not reach his post to serve owing to the sinking of the battleship Maine and to the war with Spain which followed. He was the receiver of national banks, and railroad appraiser, from 1898 until 1923. He died on March 8, 1933, in Chicago, Illinois, at age 79. He was buried in Rosehill Cemetery in Chicago, Illinois.

Family
He was married to operatic singer and actress Mariska Aldrich.

References

1853 births
1933 deaths
Burials at Rosehill Cemetery
People from Two Rivers, Wisconsin
Presidents of the Cook County Board of Commissioners
Rensselaer Polytechnic Institute alumni
Republican Party members of the United States House of Representatives from Illinois
School board members in Illinois